Affléville is a commune in the Meurthe-et-Moselle department in northeastern France.

Geography
The river Othain flows northwestward through the western part of the commune.

Population
Inhabitants are called Afflévillois.

See also
Communes of the Meurthe-et-Moselle department

References

Communes of Meurthe-et-Moselle